"Westside Story" is the debut single by American rapper and West Coast hip hop artist the Game. The song was produced by both Dr. Dre and Scott Storch, and was co-written by Mike Elizondo, Dre, Storch, the Game and 50 Cent. It was released in 2004 as the lead single from Game's debut studio album The Documentary. The song debuted at #99 and peaked at #93 on the Billboard Hot 100. It was an airplay-only release, thus no music video for the song was made. Rolling Stone's review of the album described this song as "a kind of L.A. version of "In da Club". The Game has stated that this song is a tribute to Tupac Shakur, with a direct reference to him, saying "I got +California Love+ fuckin' bitches to that Pac shit." The Game also makes references to Tupac's songs, California Love and Against All Odds. Other references include: Nate Dogg, Tha Dogg Pound (D.P.G.) and their song New York, Westside Connection, Michael Jackson and his album Thriller, DJ Pooh and Kool G Rap.

Chart performance
The song debuted at No. 99 on the Billboard Hot 100. It remained at that position the following week, before falling off the chart. It then re-entered the chart the following week at No. 98, before peaking at No. 93 the week after. After peaking, it fell off the chart completely.

Remixes
2005: "Westside Story" (Alternate Version) (featuring Snoop Dogg)
2005: "Westside Story" (Remix) (featuring 50 Cent & Daz Dillinger)

Charts

References

2004 songs
2004 debut singles
The Game (rapper) songs
50 Cent songs
Aftermath Entertainment singles
G-Unit Records singles
Interscope Records singles
Gangsta rap songs
Song recordings produced by Dr. Dre
Song recordings produced by Scott Storch
Songs written by 50 Cent
Songs written by Mike Elizondo
Songs written by Dr. Dre
Songs written by The Game (rapper)
Songs written by Scott Storch